Skills for Care is the strategic workforce development and planning body for adult social care in England.

Skills for Care is an independent registered charity working with employers, Government and partners to ensure social care has the right people, skills and support required to deliver the highest quality care and support.

Role
Skills for Care respond and adapt to the emerging trends and needs within social care, using data and evidence to drive forward widescale change. They provide best practice, tools, resources, and intelligence to support workforce recruitment, capabilities, and culture.

The organisation works with employers to gather data on the adult social care workforce through the Adult Social Care Workforce Data Set (ASC-WDS), the leading source of workforce data for the adult social care sector in England. In August 2019, ASC-WDS replaced the organisation's previous National Minimum Data Set for Social Care NMDS-SC. 

Skills for Care offers funding for training to adult social care employers through a Workforce Development Fund.

Area networks 
Skills for Care's local area teams work directly with adult social care providers, as well as a wide range of other partners within the local health and care systems.

Area networks also develop partnerships with employers to help them to get the best out of resources available for social care workforce development in their area. They can help employers to plan their workforce development requirements.

Registered manager and deputy manager networks cover 151 local authority areas, providing guidance, information sharing and a space for peer-to-peer support.

References

Sector Skills Councils